The following is an alphabetical list of topics related to the nation of Belize.

General
 Coat of arms of Belize
 Demographics of Belize
 Flag of Belize
 Foreign relations of Belize
 Great Blue Hole
 ISO 3166-2:BZ
 Sarstoon River
 The Scout Association of Belize

Buildings and structures

Archaeological sites

Maya sites
 Actun Tunichil Muknal
 Altun Ha
 Cahal Pech
 Caracol
 Cerros
 High Temple, Lamanai
 Lamanai
 Louisville, Belize
 Lubaantun
 Mask Temple, Lamanai
 Maya ruins of Belize
 Nim Li Punit
 Xunantunich

Houses

Zoos
 Belize Zoo

Cable television stations
 Krem Television
 LOVE Belize Television

Communications
.bz Internet country code top-level domain for Belize
 Amandala
 Communications in Belize
 Great Belize Productions
 Great Belize Television
 KREM FM
 Krem Television
 List of radio stations in Belize
 LOVE Belize Television
 LOVE FM
 RSV Media Center
 Speed Net
 The Belize Times
 The Guardian (Belize)
 The Reporter (Belize)
 Tropical Vision Limited

Media
 Amandala
 Centaur Cable Network
 Great Belize Productions
 Great Belize Television
 KREM FM
 Krem Television
 List of radio stations in Belize
 LOVE FM
 RSV Media Center
 The Belize Times
 The Guardian (Belize)
 The Reporter (Belize)
 Tropical Vision Limited

Newspapers
 Amandala
 The Belize Times
 The Guardian (Belize)
 The Reporter (Belize)

Radio stations
 FM 2000
 KREM FM
 List of radio stations in Belize
 LOVE FM
 WAVE Radio

Television stations
 Centaur Cable Network
 Great Belize Television
 Krem Television
 LOVE Belize Television
 Template:Television in Belize
 Tropical Vision Limited

Conservation

Culture

Music
 Brukdown
 Garifuna music
 Music of Belize
 Punta

Garifuna music
 Chumba
 Garifuna music
 Punta rock

Punta
 Punta rock

Musicians
 Andy Palacio
 Colville Young
 Francis Reneau
 Gerald Rhaburn
 Leroy Young
 Paul Nabor
 Selwyn Walford Young
 Shyne
 Wilfred Peters
  Yung Fresh

Composers
 Colville Young
 Errollyn Wallen
 Francis Reneau
 Selwyn Walford Young

Sport
 Belize at the 2006 Commonwealth Games
 Belize Premier Football League
 Cross Country Cycling Classic
 Football Federation of Belize

Football
 Belize national football team
 Belize Premier Football League
 Belmopan United
 Boca F.C.
 Football Federation of Belize
 Griga United
 Hankook Verdes
 Juventus (Belize)
 Kremandala
 Kulture Yabra FC
 New Site Erei
 San Pedro Seahawks
 Wagiya

Footballers
 Jarbi Alvarez
 Rudolph Flowers
 Shane Moody-Orio
 Stanley Reneau

Football venues
 Carl Ramos Stadium
 Isidoro Beaton Stadium
 MCC Grounds
 Michael Ashcroft Stadium
 Norman Broaster Stadium
 Orange Walk People's Stadium

Belize at the Olympics
 Belize at the 1996 Summer Olympics
 Belize at the 2000 Summer Olympics
 Belize at the 2004 Summer Olympics

Economy
 Belize dollar
 Economy of Belize

Airlines
 Maya Airways
 Maya Island Air
 Tropic Air

Companies
 Maya Island Air
 Tropic Air

RSV Media Center
 LOVE Belize Television
 LOVE FM
 RSV Media Center

Trade unions
 Belize National Teachers Union
 Christian Workers' Union
 General Workers' Union (Belize)
 National Trade Union Congress of Belize
 Public Service Union of Belize
 United General Workers Union

Education
 American Global University School of Medicine
 University of Belize

Primary schools
 Grace Primary School
 Holy Redeemer Primary School
 La Inmaculada Roman Catholic School
 Louisiana Government School
 Queen Square Primary School
 Saint Andrew's Primary School
Sarteneja Nazarene Primary School
 St. John Vianney Roman Catholic Primary School
 St. Joseph Primary School
 St. Luke Methodist School
 St. Martin Deporres School
 St. Mary's Primary School
 St. Peter Claver Primary School
 Trinity Methodist School

High schools
 Belmopan Comprehensive High School
 Bishop Martin High School
 Canaan High School
 Corozal Community College
 Edward P. Yorke High School
 Gwen Liz High School
 Mopan Technical High School
 Muffles College High school
 New Hope High School
Our Lady of Guadalupe High School
 Our Lady of Mount Carmel High School
 Palotti High School
 Sacred Heart College (Belize)
 San Pedro High School
Sarteneja Baptist High school
 St. Catherine's Academy
 St. John's College
 St. Michael's High School
 Technical High school
 Wesley College, Belize

Universities and colleges
 Belize Adventist Junior College
 Centro Escolar Mexico Junior College
 Corozal Junior College
 Galen University
 Independence Junior College
 Lynam Agricultural College 1953-1971
 Muffles Junior College
 Sacred Heart Junior College
 San Pedro Junior College
 St. John's College Junior College
 Stann Creek Ecumenical Junior College
 University of Belize
 University of the West Indies
 Wesley Junior College

University
 Galen University
 University of Belize
 University of the West Indies

Ethnic groups
 Asians
 Belizean Kriol people
 East Indian
 Garifuna people
 German Mennonites
 Lebanese
 Maya peoples
 Mestizo

Fauna

 Agkistrodon bilineatus
 Great curassow
 Jaguar
 Jaguarundi
 Ocelot
 Plain chachalaca

Flora

Geography
Adjacent countries:
 Geography of Belize

 Armenia, Belize
 Belize Barrier Reef
 Big Creek, Belize
 Blue Hole (park)
 Elridgeville
 Gales Point
 Guanacaste National Park (Belize)
 Gulf of Honduras
 Independence and Mango Creek
 Peini
 Placencia
 Port Loyola
 Ports of Belize
 Roaring Creek
 San Carlos, Belize
 San Joaquin, Corozal
 San José, Orange Walk District
 San Pedro Columbia
 Shipyard, Belize
 Silver Creek, Belize
 Spanish Lookout
 St. Margret's, Belize
 Valley of Peace, Belize

Bays
 Chetumal Bay
Corozal Bay
Sarteneja Bay

Caves
 Actun Box Ch'iich'
 Actun Tunichil Muknal

Cities and towns
 Belize City
 Belmopan
 Benque Viejo del Carmen
 Bullet Tree Falls
 Burrell Boom
 Carmelita, Belize
 Chunox
 Consejo
 Corozal Town
 Dangriga
 Guinea Grass Town
 Hattieville
 Hopkins, Belize
 Ladyville
 Las Cuevas
 Little Belize
 Monkey River Town
 Orange Walk Town
 Patchacan
 Progresso, Belize
 Punta Gorda, Belize
 San Antonio, Cayo
 San Antonio, Toledo
 San Estevan, Belize
 San Ignacio Cayo
 San Pablo, Orange Walk
 San Pedro Town
Sarteneja
 Toledo Settlement
 Trial Farm, Belize
 Xaibe

Districts
 Belize District
 Cayo District
 Corozal District
 Districts of Belize
Islands District
 Orange Walk District
 Stann Creek District
 Toledo District

Islands
 Ambergris Caye
 Caye Caulker
 Islands of Belize
 St. George's Caye

Mountains
 Doyle's Delight
 Maya Mountains
 Victoria Peak (Belize)

Parks
 Belize Botanic Gardens
 Chiquibul National Park
 Cockscomb Wildlife Sanctuary
 Guanacaste National Park
 Hol Chan Marine Reserve

Rivers
 Belize River
 Hondo River (Belize)
 Macal River
 Mopan River
 Mullins River

Subdivisions

Geography stubs
 Actun Tunichil Muknal
 Armenia, Belize
 Banco Chinchorro
 Belize Botanic Gardens
 Belize City
 Belize District
 Belize River
 Belize Zoo
 Benque Viejo del Carmen
 Big Creek, Belize
 Blue Hole (park)
 Cahal Pech
 Caracol
 Caribbean Lowlands
 Carmelita, Belize
 Cayo District
 Chetumal Bay
 Chunox
 Consejo
 Corozal District
 Corozal Town
 Dangriga
 Districts of Belize
 Doyle's Delight
 Elridgeville
 Gales Point
 Great Blue Hole
 Guanacaste National Park (Belize)
 Guinea Grass Town
 Gulf of Honduras
 Hattieville
 Hondo River (Belize)
 Hopkins, Belize
 Hummingbird Highway
 Independence and Mango Creek
 Islands of Belize
 Ladyville
 Little Belize
 Louisville, Belize
 Macal River
 Maya Mountains
 Monkey River Town
 Mopan River
 Mullins River
 Nim Li Punit
 Orange Walk District
 Orange Walk Town
 Patchacan
 Peini
 Placencia
 Port Loyola
 Ports of Belize
 Progresso, Belize
 Punta Gorda, Belize
 Roaring Creek
 San Estevan, Belize
 San Ignacio Cayo
 San Joaquin, Corozal
 San José, Orange Walk District
 San Pablo, Orange Walk
 San Pedro Town
Sarteneja
 Shipyard, Belize
 Silver Creek, Belize
 Spanish Lookout
 St. George's Caye
 St. Margret's, Belize
 Stann Creek District
 Template:Belize-geo-stub
 Toledo District
 Toledo Settlement
 Trial Farm, Belize
 Valley of Peace, Belize
 Xaibe
 Xunantunich

Government
 Senate of Belize

Official residences
 Government House, Belize

History
 2005 Belize unrest
 Battlefield Park
 British Honduras
 Captaincy General of Guatemala
 Cross Country Cycling Classic
 Dausuva
 Guatemalan claim to Belizean territory
 History of Belize

Elections
 Belize legislative election, 1974
 Belize legislative election, 1979
 Belize legislative election, 1984
 Belize legislative election, 1989
 Belize legislative election, 1993
 Belize legislative election, 1998
 Belize legislative election, 2003
 Belize municipal election, 2006
 British Honduras legislative election, 1954
 British Honduras legislative election, 1957
 British Honduras legislative election, 1961
 British Honduras legislative election, 1969
 Elections and Boundaries Commission
 Elections and Boundaries Department
 Elections in Belize

Municipal elections
 Belize municipal election, 2006

Hurricanes
 1934 Central America Hurricane
 Hurricane Edith
 Hurricane Francelia
 Hurricane Greta-Olivia
 Hurricane Hattie
 Hurricane Iris
 Hurricane Janet
 Hurricane Keith

Languages
 Belizean Kriol language
 Garifuna language
 Guatemala-Belize Language Exchange Project
 Languages of Belize
 Mopan language
 Q'eqchi
 Spanish language

People
 Abdulai Conteh
 Alice Gibson
 Antonio Soberanis Gómez
 Baron Bliss
 :Category:Belizean people
 :Category:Roman Catholic bishops in Belize
 Chito Martínez
 Elijio Panti
 Evan X Hyde
 George Enrique Herbert
 John Avery (journalist)
 Marion Jones
 Marion M. Ganey
 Michael Ashcroft
 Samuel Alfred Haynes
 Thomas Gann

People by occupation

Sportspeople

Athletes
 Emma Wade

Basketball players
 Milt Palacio

Musicians
 Moses Michael Levi Barrow (born Jamal Michael Barrow; 1978), better known by his stage name Shyne, rapper and politician

Writers
 Colville Young
 Evan X Hyde

Novelists
 Colville Young
 Zee Edgell

Short story writers
 Colville Young

Nurses
Cleopatra White

Politics
 Commonwealth realm
 Elections and Boundaries Commission
 Elections and Boundaries Department
 House of Representatives of Belize
 Leader of the Opposition, Belize
 List of political parties in Belize
 Politics of Belize
 Senate of Belize

Politicians
 Adolfo Lizarraga
 Dean Barrow
 Godfrey Smith (politician)
 Gwendolyn Lizarraga
 Jane Ellen Usher
 Lisa Shoman
 Moses Michael Levi Barrow (born Jamal Michael Barrow; 1978), better known by his stage name Shyne
 Said Musa

People's United Party politicians
 Dolores Balderamos-Garcia
 Godfrey Smith (politician)
 John Briceño
 Jorge Espat
 Jose Coye
 Marcial Mes
 Maxwell Samuels
 Ralph Fonseca
 Valdemar Castillo

Prime Ministers
 George Cadle Price
 List of prime ministers of Belize
 Manuel Esquivel
 Said Musa

Political parties
 Democratic and Agricultural Labour Party (DALP)
 Honduran Independence Party (HIP)
 List of political parties in Belize
 National Alliance for Belizean Rights (NABR)
 National Independence Party (Belize) (NIP)
 National Party (Belize) (NP)
 National Reform Party (NRP)
 People's United Party

 United Black Association for Development (UBAD)
 United Democratic Party (Belize)
 Vision Inspired by the People (VIP)
 We the People Reform Movement (WTP)

Religion

Churches (communities and buildings)

H
 Holy Redeemer Cathedral 
 Holy Redeemer Catholic Parish, Belize City
P
 Port Loyola Calvary Chapel
 Presbyterian Church of Belize
S
 Sacred Heart Church, Dangriga 
 St. Andrew's Anglican Church (San Ignacio)
 St. Andrew's Church (Belize City)
 St. Ann's Anglican Church
 St. John's Cathedral (Belize City) 
 St. Peter Claver, Punta Gorda
U
 Unity Presbyterian Church

History
 Anglican Diocese of Belize
 Belize Evangelical Mennonite Church
 History of Roman Catholicism in Belize
 Mennonites in Belize

Personages
 Roman Catholic
 Bishop Salvatore di Pietro
 Bishop Frederick C. Hopkins
 Bishop Joseph Anthony Murphy
 Bishop William A. Rice
 Bishop David Francis Hickey
 Bishop Robert Louis Hodapp
 Bishop Osmond P. Martin
 Bishop Dorick M. Wright
 Bishop Christopher Glancy
 Marion M. Ganey, SJ
 Caritas Gloria Lawrence, RSM
 William “Buck” Stanton, SJ

Transport
 Hummingbird Highway
 Rail transport in Belize
 Southern Highway
 Transport in Belize

Airports
 List of airports in Belize
 Philip S. W. Goldson International Airport

Roads
 George Price Highway
 Hummingbird Highway
 Northern Highway, Belize
 Southern Highway

Visitor attractions

Stub articles
 .bz
 Abdulai Conteh
 Andy Palacio
 Antonio Soberanis Gómez
 Baron Bliss
 Battlefield Park
 Belize at the 1996 Summer Olympics
 Belize at the 2000 Summer Olympics
 Belize at the 2006 Commonwealth Games
 Belize dollar
 Belize Premier Football League
 Belizean Kriol people
 Belmopan United
 British Honduras
 Brukdown
 Carl Ramos Stadium
 Centaur Cable Network
 Chito Martínez
 Christian Workers' Union
 Chumba
 Coat of arms of Belize
 Communications in Belize
 Dausuva
 Elijio Panti
 Elmira Minita Gordon
 Emma Wade
 Evan X Hyde
 Flag of Belize
 FM 2000
 Football Federation of Belize
 Francis Reneau
 General Workers' Union (Belize)
 Gerald Rhaburn
 Godfrey Smith (politician)
 Griga United
 Hankook Verdes
 High Temple, Lamanai
 Holy Redeemer Primary School
 IFOB
 Isidro Belton Stadium
 Islam in Belize
 Jarbi Alvarez
 John Avery (journalist)
 Juventus (Belize)
 Kremandala
 Kulture Yabra FC
 Languages of Belize
 Las Cuevas
 Leroy Young
 List of endemic species of Belize
 Manuel Esquivel
 Marion Jones Sports Complex
 Maya ruins of Belize
 Michael Ashcroft Stadium
 Military of Belize
 Milt Palacio
 Misuse of Drugs Act (Belize)
 National Alliance for Belizean Rights (NABR)
 National Assembly of Belize
 National Independence Party (Belize)
 National Trade Union Congress of Belize
 New Site Erei
 Norman Broaster Stadium
 Orange Walk People's Stadium
 Paul Nabor
 Philip S. Wright
 Q'eqchi
 Rail transport in Belize
 Roman Catholicism in Belize
 RSV Media Center
 Rudolph Flowers
 Said Musa
 Saint Andrew's Primary School
 Samuel Alfred Haynes
 San Pedro Seahawks
 Sarstoon River
 Selwyn Walford Young
 Senate of Belize
 Shane Moody-Orio
 Southern Highway
 St. John Vianney Roman Catholic Primary School
 Stanley Reneau
 Template:Belize-stub
 The Reporter (Belize)
 Tropic Air
 Tropical Vision Limited
 United General Workers Union
 Wagiya
 Walter Lewis
 WAVE Radio
 Western Highway, Belize
 Wilfred Peters
 Zee Edgell

See also

Commonwealth of Nations
List of Belize-related topics
List of Central America-related topics
List of international rankings
Lists of country-related topics
Outline of geography
Outline of North America
United Nations

External links